"Imported" is a song by Canadian singer Jessie Reyez from her second extended play Being Human in Public (2018). The original version of the song featured Jamaican singer JRM. Both artists wrote the song alongside its producer Hennedub.

Personnel
Credits adapted from Tidal.
 Hennedub – producer, bass, drums, keyboard, percussion, recording engineer
 Anders Soe – guitar
 Riley Bell – mixer

6lack remix

Release
A remix of the song with American singer and rapper 6lack was released as a single by FMLY and Island Records on April 9, 2019 as the second single of Reyez's debut studio album Before Love Came to Kill Us (2020). The 6lack remix of "Imported" premiered on Zane Lowe's Beats 1 radio show on April 9, 2019. It was released on digital platforms the same day.

Commercial performance
In the US, "Imported" peaked at 14 on the R&B Songs chart and ranked at 33 on its year-end chart. The song did not enter the Billboard Hot 100 but peaked at 24 on the Bubbling Under Hot 100. It also reached a peak of 36 on the R&B/Hip-Hop Airplay chart and 19 on the Rhythmic chart.

"Imported" received a platinum certification from the Recording Industry Association of America (RIAA) for selling one million track-equivalent units in the US and a platinum certification from Music Canada for selling forty thousand track-equivalent units in Canada.

Music video
The music video for "Imported" was released on April 10, 2019 on YouTube. It was directed by Zac Facts. Jessie Reyez and 6lack portrayed two people going through a heartbreak.

Live performances
Jessie Reyez and 6lack performed "Imported" with a live band on The Late Show with Stephen Colbert on June 11, 2019. They provided backing vocals to each other's verses and sang the last chorus together.

Charts

Weekly charts

Year-end charts

Certifications

References

2018 songs
2019 singles
6lack songs
Island Records singles
Jessie Reyez songs
Songs written by 6lack
Songs written by Jessie Reyez